Pavel Alekseyevich Cherenkov (July 28, 1904 – January 6, 1990) was a Soviet physicist who shared the Nobel Prize in physics in 1958 with Ilya Frank and Igor Tamm for the discovery of Cherenkov radiation, made in 1934.

Biography

Cherenkov was born in 1904 to Alexey Cherenkov and Mariya Cherenkova in the small village of Novaya Chigla.  This town is in present-day Voronezh Oblast, Russia.

In 1928,  he graduated from the Department of Physics and Mathematics of Voronezh State University.  In 1930, he took a post as a senior researcher in the Lebedev Physical Institute. That same year he married Maria Putintseva, daughter of A.M. Putintsev, a Professor of Russian Literature. They had a son, Alexey, and a daughter, Yelena.

Cherenkov was promoted to section leader, and in 1940 was awarded the degree of Doctor of Physico-Mathematical Sciences. In 1953, he was confirmed as Professor of Experimental Physics. Starting in 1959, he headed the institute's photo-meson processes laboratory. He remained a professor for fourteen years. In 1970, he became Academician of the USSR Academy of Sciences.

Cherenkov died in Moscow on January 6, 1990, and was buried  in Novodevichy Cemetery.

Discoveries in physics

In 1934, while working under S. I. Vavilov, Cherenkov observed the emission of blue light from a bottle of water subjected to radioactive bombardment. This phenomenon, associated with charged subatomic particles moving at velocities greater than the phase velocity of light, proved to be of great importance in subsequent experimental work in nuclear physics, and for the study of cosmic rays. Eponymously, it was dubbed the Cherenkov effect, as was the Cherenkov detector, which has become a standard piece of equipment in particle-physics research for observing the existence and velocity of high-speed particles. Such a device was installed in Sputnik 3.

Pavel Cherenkov also shared in the development and construction of electron accelerators and in the investigation of photo-nuclear and photo-meson reactions.

Awards and honours
Cherenkov was awarded two Stalin Prizes, the first in 1946, sharing the honor with Vavilov, Frank and Tamm, and another in 1952. He was also awarded the USSR State Prize in 1977. In 1958, he was awarded the Nobel Prize in Physics for the discovery of the Cherenkov effect. He was also awarded the Soviet Union's Hero of Socialist Labour title in 1984. Cherenkov was a member of the Communist Party of the Soviet Union.

In popular culture
The novel  Ghost Fleet makes the claim that many believe the Star Trek character Pavel Chekov is named after Pavel Cherenkov.

In Starship Troopers spaceships travel faster than light using Cherenkov Drive.

References

External links

 Cherenkov's photo – from the Russian Academy of Sciences
 
  including his Nobel Lecture, December 11, 1958 Radiation of Particles Moving at a Velocity Exceeding That of Light, and Some of the Possibilities for Their Use in Experimental Physics

1904 births
1990 deaths
Burials at Novodevichy Cemetery
Experimental physicists
Heroes of Socialist Labour
Recipients of the USSR State Prize
Full Members of the USSR Academy of Sciences
Nobel laureates in Physics
Particle physicists
Soviet inventors
Soviet Nobel laureates
Soviet physicists
Stalin Prize winners
Communist Party of the Soviet Union members
Voronezh State University alumni
Academic staff of Moscow Power Engineering Institute
Foreign associates of the National Academy of Sciences